William Ledyard Stark (July 29, 1853 – November 11, 1922) was an American Populist Party politician.

Born in Mystic, Connecticut on July 29, 1853, Stark moved to Wyoming, Illinois, in 1872. He taught school and worked as a clerk at a store. He attended Union College of Law in Chicago, Illinois. He was admitted to the bar by the Supreme Court of Illinois in January 1878.

Stark moved to Aurora, Nebraska, in February 1878, serving as superintendent of city schools in Aurora. He became deputy district attorney and then judge of the Hamilton County Court in Hamilton County, Nebraska. He served in the Nebraska National Guard as a major and Judge Advocate General. He ran for the United States House of Representatives in 1895 and 1897 as a Populist, losing the first time and before being elected to the 55th United States Congress on his second attempt . He was reelected to the 56th and 57th Congresses, serving from March 4, 1897 to March 3, 1903.

Stark ran for the United States Congress as a Fusionist in 1902, but lost. After leaving office in 1903, he retired to Aurora.

Stark died in Tarpon Springs, Florida on November 11, 1922. He is buried in the city cemetery in Aurora.

References
 
 
 

1853 births
1922 deaths
People from Mystic, Connecticut
People's Party members of the United States House of Representatives from Nebraska
Nebraska Populists
People from Aurora, Nebraska
People from Wyoming, Illinois
Nebraska National Guard personnel
Illinois lawyers
Nebraska lawyers
Nebraska state court judges
Northwestern University Pritzker School of Law alumni
19th-century American lawyers
Members of the United States House of Representatives from Nebraska